Michael John Lithgow, OBE (30 August 1920 – 22 October 1963) was a British aviator and chief test pilot for Vickers Supermarine who became the holder of the World Absolute Air Speed Record in 1953 flying a Supermarine Swift. He died when the prototype BAC One-Eleven airliner crashed in 1963.

Early life 
Mike Lithgow was born on 30 August 1920 and educated at Cheltenham College.

Second World War 
Joined Fleet Air Arm March 1939 – December 1945
As a Lieutenant Commander on the HMS Ark Royal he flew Swordfish torpedo bombers, and was one of the pilots attacking the Bismarck

Test Pilot 

He retired from the Navy and moved to Vickers Supermarine as a test pilot in January 1946 and became the company's chief test pilot two years later.

In September 1946 he took part in the Lympne high speed air race, flying a Supermarine Seafang, competing against Bill Humble in a Hawker Fury, Geoffrey de Havilland in a D.H. Vampire and G.H Pike in a D.H. Hornet

On 26 September 1953 flying the Supermarine Swift F.4 prototype, WK198, Lithgow broke the World Air Speed Record near Tripoli in Libya, reaching a speed of 735.7 mph (1184 km/h). He was awarded the Gold Medal of the Royal Aero Club and the Geoffrey de Havilland Trophy in 1953

He did extensive test flying on the Supermarine Attacker, Swift, Scimitar and later the Vickers Vanguard and BAC 1–11.

Lithgow died test flying the prototype BAC One-Eleven G-ASHG from Wisley airfield on 22 October 1963 when during stall tests the aircraft entered a deep stall and crashed near Chicklade, Wiltshire. Six other BAC flight test team members were killed too.

References

Citations

Sources
Autobiography:  Mach One. (Oct 1954). Allan Wingate Ltd. ASIN: B0000CIZSW
Editor:  Vapour Trails. (1956). Allan Wingate Ltd. ASIN: B0000CJFFQ

External links
 Supermarine Swift history

1920 births
1963 deaths
People educated at Cheltenham College
Royal Navy officers
Royal Navy officers of World War II
Fleet Air Arm aviators
British test pilots
Officers of the Order of the British Empire
Aviators killed in aviation accidents or incidents in England
Fleet Air Arm personnel of World War II